Kvasiny (German: Kwasney) is a municipality and village in Rychnov nad Kněžnou District in the Hradec Králové Region of the Czech Republic. It has about 1,500 inhabitants.

Economy

Kvasiny is home to the Volkswagen Group-owned Škoda Auto factory.

References

Villages in Rychnov nad Kněžnou District
Company towns